Jhirkeshwar Mahadev (Devnagari: झिरकेश्वर महादेव) is an ancient Hindu temple dedicated to Lord Shiva and located in Ferozepur Jhirka, Haryana, India. This cave temple is located at foothills of Aravalli Range. The temple's presiding deity, a Shiva Lingam, is self manifested.

History
According to legend, the Shiva Lingam was manifested by the invocation of Mantras by the eldest Pandava brother, Yudhishthira when they were going to Virat Nagar during exile. Later in 1870, Lord Shiva appeared in the dreams of Pandit Jeevanalal Sharma, a tehsildar (tax inspector). He built the top of the temple. Since 1970, Shiva temple development board, registered under Haryana government has been looking after temple affairs.

Festivals
A big fair is held on Maha Shivaratri and during Hindu calendar month of Shraavana.

References

Hindu temples in Haryana